Kooi-Ying Mah (born 1950) is an Australian architect, designer, and principal Kooi-Ying Architects. She  worked in London, Kuala Lumpur, Melbourne and Sydney, before starting her own practice in Sydney.

Early life and education

Kooi-Ying Mah was born in Taiping, Malaysia, and migrated to Australia in 1970. She studied at the University of Melbourne, and received her Bachelor of Architecture in 1977.

Career and selected work

After studying and graduating in Melbourne, Mah began her professional working life at Denton Corker Marshall. In 1980 she moved to Sydney, where she joined Ancher Mortlock and Woolley. She has also worked in large commercial architectural practices in London and Kuala Lumpur. In 1993 she established M + N Architects with Berlin Ng. Kooi-Ying Architects was founded in 2004, with a focus on residential work.

Civic Hotel

This project located in the central southern end of Sydney CBD, involved the recycling and adaptive re-use of the 1930s dilapidated four levels corner heritage pub and construction of a new 17-storey hotel addition. The Civic Hotel was originally designed by R. A. Provost in 1940–41 in the art deco style. The site for the hotel consists of the old Civic Hotel and two narrow adjacent shop houses. The hotel includes 166 rooms and reception areas over 17 storeys. The refurbished Civic Hotel won the Royal Australia Institute of Architects 2000 NSW Chapter Commendation Award for Conservation and Adaptive Re-Use.

Recent work

The Scarp house, completed in 2007, has gained recognition through the Historic Houses Trust of New South Wales 2008 Sydney Open Focus Tours and was  featured in Monument Magazine and the 2010 book 21st Century Houses Down Under. The house is recognised for its inventive structure and its sensitivity to the  surrounding environment. Located on a steep incline in the Castlecrag foreshore, it unfolds around a large rock escarpment, embracing part of the rock as a feature to the house.

Pro bono work

One of Mah's more recent  projects is Dana Hall, a meditation and giving hall for devotees to a Buddhist monastery in North East Thailand. This was a pro bono project that involved her being actively engaged with the Buddhist monks and their ascetic lifestyle in the rainforest environment.

References

External links
 

1950 births
Living people
Australian women architects
20th-century Australian architects
21st-century Australian architects
University of Melbourne alumni
Architects from Melbourne
20th-century Australian women
21st-century Australian women